This is a list of non-governmental organizations with consultative status at the United Nations.

 Agri-Energy Roundtable
 Article 12
 CANADEM
 Conference of NGOs
 Global Policy Forum
 Global Youth Action Network
 International League of Esperanto Instructors
 Islands First
 Russian Academy of Natural Sciences
 United Nations Youth Associations Network
 Universal Esperanto Association
 World Association of Investment Promotion Agencies
 World Council of Arameans
 World Federation of United Nations Associations

See also
 :Category:United Nations Youth Associations Network
 :Category:World Federation of United Nations Associations
 List of organizations with consultative status to the United Nations Economic and Social Council

References

Lists of organizations
Non-governmental organizations
Non-governmental organizations
United Nations